Jizhou or Ji Prefecture was a zhou (prefecture) in imperial China centering on modern Jining, Shandong, China. It existed (intermittently) from 951 until 1348.

Geography
The administrative region of Ji Prefecture in Later Zhou is in modern southwestern Shandong. It probably includes parts of modern: 
Under the administration of Jining:
Jining
Jinxiang County
Under the administration of Heze:
Juye County
Yuncheng County

References
 

Prefectures of the Song dynasty
Prefectures of Later Zhou
Prefectures of the Jin dynasty (1115–1234)
Prefectures of the Yuan dynasty
Former prefectures in Shandong